The Death of Stalinism in Bohemia is a 1990 animated surrealist short film by Jan Švankmajer. In 1990 the BBC asked Švankmajer to make a film about situation in Czechoslovakia. Švankmajer later remarked: "Despite the fact that this film emerged along the same path of imagination as all my other films, I never pretended that it was anything more than propaganda. Therefore I think it is a film which will age more quickly than any of the others."

Plot
Stalin's bust is opened on an operating table, and this leads into an animated sequence which depicts Czech history from 1948, when it was taken over by Communists, to 1989, when the Velvet Revolution took place.

Reception
Janet Maslin of The New York Times describes the film as being a "wonderfully apt short", and describes the plot of "rush[ing] a statue of Stalin through drastic surgery, cranks out clay workers on an assembly line only to grind them back into clay" is "droll, breakneck satire".

Release
The film aired on BBC Two in the UK on 3 June 1990.

References

External links
 
 The Wager of a Militant Surrealist
 Wonders in the Dark

1990 animated films
1990 films
1990s animated short films
British animated short films
Films directed by Jan Švankmajer
1990s British films